For the area in Sulawesi see Sawangan, Sulawesi

Sawangan is an administrative district in the city of Depok, in West Java province of  Indonesia. It covers an area of 26.19 km2 and had a population of 123,571 at the 2010 census; the latest official estimate (as at mid 2018) is 165,631.

Villages
Sawangan has 7 villages:
Sawangan
Kedaung
Cinangka
Sawangan Baru
Bedahan
Pengasinan
Pasir Putih

References

depok
Populated places in West Java